Weert is a village in the Bilzen municipality of the Limburg province in the Flemish Community of Belgium.

The village was first mentioned as Hameau Wert in the 1770s. The village was considered a neighbourhood of Grote-Spouwen, however it was a separate loan of the County of Loon and therefore semi-independent with its own mayor. In 1977, the village became part of the Bilzen municipality.

References

Bilzen
Populated places in Limburg (Belgium)